Three Discourses on Imagined Occasions (1845) is a book by Søren Kierkegaard.

History
Kierkegaard published Eighteen Upbuilding Discourses between the years 1843 and 1844 as well as a number of pseudonymous books.  His category from Either/Or is to choose and his category from his discourses is the "single individual". He informed readers to pay attention to the prefaces in his works and has one in this book which speaks about "meaning" and the "appropriation" of meaning and has repeatedly said that he didn't have the "authority to preach or to teach." Here, in his Preface, he wrote: "This little book, which might be called a book of occasional addresses, although it has neither the occasion which creates the speaker and gives him authority, nor the occasion that creates the hearer and makes him a learner, is lacking in the legitimation of a call, and is thus in its shortcomings without excuse. It is without assistance from external circumstances, and thus quite helpless in its elaboration."

He wrote of an apostle who didn't have the easiest time being a Christian. "Now Paul! Did he live in the favor of the mighty so that it could commend his teaching? No, he was a prisoner! Did the wise hail his teaching so that their reputation could guarantee its truth? No, to them it was foolishness. Was his teaching capable of quickly supplying the individual with a supranatural power, did it offer itself for sale to people through legerdemain? No, it had to be acquired slowly, appropriated in the ordeal that began with the renunciation of everything." Would Paul have become a Christian if he knew what was in store for him? Each single individual has a future and there comes a time when a decision is made that can have long-lasting effects. Paul wrote about his own experiences in his epistles and Kierkegaard thought this was a legitimate way to preach about Christianity. But he stressed indirect communication. 

In these final three discourses of his first authorship he chooses to write about Confession before God about guilt, sin, forgiveness, marriage and death and the answers that seem to come or don't seem to come to the inquiring individual.

Structure
Soren Aaby Kierkegaard had Three Discourses on Imagined Occasions published April 29, 1845 and Stages on Life's Way April 30, 1845. Both books were divided into three sections: confession, marriage, and death; three crucial occasions in the life of each single individual. David F. Swenson translated the book as Thoughts on Crucial Situations in Human Life (subtitle: Three Discourses on Imagined Occasions) 1941 and Howard V. Hong and Edna H. Hong did so in 1993 under the title, Three Discourses on Imagined Occasions.

 What It Means To Seek God, On the Occasion of a Confessional Service 
 Love Conquers All, On the Occasion of a Wedding
 The Decisiveness of Death, At the Side of a Grave, (Hong, At a Graveside)
(Swenson's translation has both titles while Hong's has only the latter, both Swenson and Hong translated Kierkegaard's Eighteen Upbuilding Discourses also)

Each of these imagined discourses involve the anxiety of making a decision. Kierkegaard wrote much on that subject earlier as well as in his later works. 
1844: The Concept of Anxiety
 1848: The Care of Indecesiveness, Vacillation, and Disconsolateness from Christian Discourses

What It Means to Seek God
Many times an individual has a physical sickness and goes to the physician for help. But is that the only kind of sickness there is? Kierkegaard was interested in spiritual sickness called sin and the expectancy of forgiveness which are both Christian categories. We "must want to understand the forgiveness of sins-and then despair of understanding it." Later, in The Sickness Unto Death Kierkegaard writes of the sin of despairing over one's sin and the sin of despairing of the forgiveness of sins. Robert L. Perkins from Mercer University published a group of essays about these three discourses in 2006. Kierkegaard has moved forward from fear and trembling to fear and wonder within the two years of his published works. Wonder is more positive than fear.

He suspected his father, Michael, suffered from this "sickness of the spirit" because of something he had done as a young man or while grieving the loss of his first wife. Lee M. Hollander thought he was afraid he had committed the Eternal sin, one that can never be forgiven. Kierkegaard called his gaining knowledge of his father's sin the "great earthquake". Maybe he heard someone say that cursing God was the unforgivable sin or that fornication was the unforgivable sin.  Kierkegaard wrote out of concern for his father's anxiety and others like him who believe that God shuts his door against them. He asks, “How does a person get to know that he is the greatest sinner?” Kierkegaard started in Either/Or with two characters known only as A and B, both were in search of a self, and he worked himself up to The Concept of Anxiety where he remarked; "If a person does not first make clear to himself the meaning of “self,” it is of no use to say of sin that it is selfishness." His father was only twelve when he cursed God and didn't have faith that God would forgive him. Goethe had the same problem because he had many experiences while he was still young.

Many speculative individuals want to express their opinion about the mysteries of the Christian religion and the nature of sin and guilt. Kierkegaard warns against doing this, because "the most dangerous condition is that of the one who is deceived by much knowledge," knowing is one thing, doing another. "If anyone has the task of preaching or teaching others about their guilt, of teaching-something that this discourse, which is without authority, does not do-he does have the consolation that the purest heart is precisely the one most willing to comprehend his own guilt most deeply."  Kierkegaard asked every single individual these questions in his 1847 book, Works of Love in an effort to show how useless it is to compare sin for sin and guilt for guilt. 

Kierkegaard was interested in "how" one comes to acquire knowledge. Adolph Peter Adlers experience may have influenced him. He identified his audience as the "reader" and the "listener" but now he speaks of the "seeker". He says, "no man can see God without purity and that no man can know God without becoming a sinner. Dostoevsky tried to reproduce this concept in his art. In Stages on Life's Way, published the next day, he used David and Solomon as examples of those prototypes who did become pure in God's sight by becoming sinners. "While David lay upon the ground with crushed and contrite heart, Solomon arose from his couch, but his understanding was crushed. Horror seized him when he thought of what it was to be God’s elect. He surmised that holy intimacy with God, the sincerity of the pure man before the Lord, was not the explanation, but that a private guilt was the secret which explained everything."

He speaks of finding God in the "darkness" and the "stillness" and "of this stillness and its power and the infinite nothing into which it plunges all dissimilarities, even those of wrongs and forgiveness, and of the abyss into which the solitary one sinks in stillness." And asks, "Is it so easy to become still?" This, then, is his imaginative creation of the world of the spirit and he lets the reader know that it's imaginative in his title.

He also wrote much about "expectancy" and where it is found. Now he writes about the darkness, stillness, the "unknown" and sin. He says "sin is the common lot of the human race".

Love Conquers All
"Where is earnestness learned? In life." And how can earnestness be lost? How is it related to the resolution? Does "love conquer everything?" Kierkegaard thinks, "a true conception of life and of oneself is required for the resolution of marriage; but this already implies the second great requirement, which is just like the first: a true conception of God. No one can have a true conception of God without having a corresponding conception of life and oneself, or a true conception of life without a corresponding conception of God, or a true conception of life without a corresponding conception of oneself. But a true conception of God is required; an understanding between God and the happy one is required, and thus a language is required in which they talk to each other. This language is the resolution, the only language in which God will involve himself with a human being."  He asks, "Where does a person find guidance if he himself does not work out his own soul's salvation in fear and trembling"? He's writing about the wedding ceremony in this discourse just as he wrote about it in Either/Or and Repetition. Here he presents his own imaginative construction of the value of the single individual making a decision about marriage in the presence of God. Even though he never married he still knows that "the adult learns only by appropriating and he essentially appropriates the essential only by doing it."  

An "observer" may say that the resolution of love was lacking because the marriage didn't work out but how does the observer know that? Perhaps "it wanted a rebirth of erotic love" or of "earnestness".  A poet looks for the "rare individual" in order to demonstrate love's rebirth. Kierkegaard almost married Regine Olsen but changed his mind. Perhaps he wanted her to help him in his vocation as a writer just as Lillian Marvin Swenson helped her husband David and Edna H. Hong helped Howard V Hong later in life. He used that experience to build himself up rather than tear himself down. He places the responsibility on the individual listener, reader, watcher, or "doer".  He stated his idea of hope and courage in the face of doubt in his Journals and again in this book.

His book Either/Or discussed whether or not love can be deceived. Is it a good thing to find out you have been deceived or is it something that makes you angry? Kierkegaard had already discussed anger in his Two Upbuilding Discourses, 1843 where he quoted The Epistle of James, Therefore, my beloved brethren, let every man be quick to hear, slow to speak, slow to anger, because man’s anger does not work what is righteous before God. (James 1:17-22) Earlier in the same discourse he had discussed equality. There is neither Jew nor Greek, slave nor free, male nor female, for you are all one in Christ Jesus. He asks pointed questions, "Did the woman who was a sinner feel her guilt more deeply when the scribes were accusing her than when there was no accuser anymore and she stood alone before the Lord! But you also realize that the most dangerously deceived person is the one who is self-deceived, that the most dangerous condition is that of the one who is deceived by much knowledge, and, furthermore, that it is a lamentable weakness to have one’s consolation in another’s light-mindedness, but it is also a lamentable weakness to have one’s terror from another’s heavy-mindedness. Leave it solely to God-after all, he knows best how to take care of everything for one who becomes alone by seeking him."

The Decisiveness of Death
Kierkegaard has been writing about the confession of sin before God, confession of love for another before God and how an individual learns to make a resolution. Now he's writing about "death's decision" and the "earnestness" that death brings into the world. Death says, “I exist; if anyone wants to learn from me, then let him come to me.”

Many individuals want to be teachers of mankind but Kierkegaard has emphasized the teachers that accompany man from one generation to another. He wrote of Abraham, Job, The Apostle Paul, and Anna and Simeon as teachers of mankind in his Eighteen Upbuilding Discourses and Johann Goethe and Friedrich Hegel as teachers of aesthetics and ethics. But he's writing about the earnest confession before God, marriage, and death as teachers of another kind that accompanies mankind from generation to generation. Later he uses the "lily of the field and the bird of the air" to teach what it means to be a human being where he calls them the "divinely appointed teachers".

Kierkegaard says, "Just as death’s decision is not definable by equality, so it is likewise not definable by inequality." Death is not the way all become equal but being able to go before God as a single individual is what creates equality for all since God shows no partiality and God has created death as the inexplicable. 
Therefore, God doesn't deal with the crowd but with the single individual as the one having anxiety and worry. The king and the beggar are equal before God and the beggar is no more to pray against the king than the king is to pray against the beggar. The same goes for the man and the woman.  The highest His Imperial Highness is able to do, however, is to make the decision before God. The lowliest human being can also make his decision before God.

Criticism
Kierkegaard published these discourses by himself in the usual edition of 525 copies with only 175 sold by 1847. A second edition was published in 1875. He had already finished his Concluding Postscript and delivered it to Luno, his printer, by December 1845. The Corsair Affair occupied some of his time and caused him some anxiety after 1845. Later, February 7, 1846, he wrote in his diary "it is now my intention to qualify as a pastor. For several months I have been praying to God to help me ..." He didn't want to preach in a huge church but rather in a small church where he could speak to the single individual. He had already preached one sermon at Trinitatis Church in Copenhagen on February 24, 1844 so he has some experience but is still full of imaginative constructions. 

David F. Swenson translated many of Kierkegaard's works into English and helped introduce him to the English reading public as early as 1916. His translation was published in 1941. He wrote a short introduction stating that "God is a person; His will is the everlasting distinction between righteousness and unrighteousness, good and evil; it is goodness and love. Love and righteousness do not attach to impersonal things or essences; the idea of good is not good." Swenson discussed this same book again when he translated Kierkegaard's Edifying Discourses in 1945. He said, "Only in this final group of discourses, which, while outside the eighteen, essentially belong with them (Thoughts on Crucial Situations in Human Life), which appeared in 1845 and was written to accompany the Postscript has God become a person, and the Christian faith is a concrete personal attitude."

Walter Lowrie reminds the reader that Kierkegaard has said, 'With my right hand I held out the Edifying Discourses, with my left the aesthetic works-and all grasped with the right hand what I held in my left.’ This would pair right and left as Three Discourses on Imagined Occasions and Stages on Life’s Way, then Three Discourses in Various Spirits with A Literary Review; and The Lilies of the Field and the Birds of the Air with Either/Or, 2nd edition. He indicates a plan to Kierkegaard's writing.

Howard V. Hong said Kierkegaard had “seeds for more than six discourses in mind; Three on Peter’s Denial of Christ, three on the Canaanite Woman, and two on suffering as guilty or innocent, as well as funeral addresses to the king’s deceased valet and for the prophetess Anna. He pared this down to the Three Imagined Discourses published here in 1845.

John Gates barely mentions the Imagined Discourses in his book on the life of Kierkegaard, but he does see it as a turning point in the development of his vocation and gives an insight into his manner of writing. 

Gregor Malantschuk, said Kierkegaard's first eighteen discourses were about resignation. "The individual learns in everything to bend his will to God and to endure patiently his destiny. Then he published Three Discourses on Imagined Occasions, the first of which treats of man's aspiration toward God and his meeting with God and gives a deep insight into the development of man's conception of God. The second discusses the gravity of the wedding vow and the responsibility to God in establishing a marriage. the last is a solemn enlightening meditation on death." Malantschuk goes on to say, "None of these discourses has yet arrived at the distinctively Christian. For this there must first be a long preparation."

References

External links

Love Conquers All Complete text, Swenson translation
Three Discourses on Imagined Occasions Princeton University Press
Thoughts on crucial situations in human life; three discourses on imagined occasions, by Søren Kierkegaard, translated from the Danish by David F. Swenson, edited by Lillian Marvin Swenson Haithi trust
Prefaces and Writing Sampler: And, Three Discourses on Imagined Occasions edited by Robert L. Perkins Mercer University Press, 2006
David F Swenson, The Category of the Unknowable (September 14, 1905) archive.org
Anthony Storm on Kierkegaard's Three Discourses on Imagined Occasions

1845 books
Books by Søren Kierkegaard
Epistemology literature
Philosophy of religion literature